Inverness, Nairn and Badenoch and Strathspey, may refer to:

 Inverness, Nairn and Badenoch and Strathspey, one of three corporate management areas of the Highland Council, Scotland, created in 2007
 Inverness, Nairn, Badenoch and Strathspey (UK Parliament constituency), a Scottish constituency of the House of Commons of the Parliament of the United Kingdom